Wendy McMurdo (born 1962) specialises in photography and digital media. In 2018 she was named as one of the Hundred Heroines, an award created by the Royal Photographic Society to showcase the best of global contemporary female photographic practice.

Early life and education
McMurdo was born in Edinburgh, Scotland. She attended Edinburgh College of Art, Goldsmiths, University of London and Pratt Institute in Brooklyn, New York where she first became interested in photography.

Career
Her work centres around the relationship between technology and identity and she has produced several influential bodies of work which explore this theme.

In the mid-1990s her first one-person show In a Shaded Place – the digital and the uncanny  was toured extensively by the British Council. Her subsequent exhibition at the Centro de Fotografia Universidad de Salamanca in 1998 resulted in the publication of the first monograph on her work. She has been included in numerous group shows, including Unheimlich, curated by Urs Stahel at the Fotomuseum Winterthur in Switzerland, Scanner, curated by Lawrence Rinder at the CCA Wattis Institute for Contemporary Arts, San Francisco, California, The Anagrammatical Body – The Body and its Photographic Condition at the Neue Galerie Graz am Landesmuseum Joanneum in Graz, Austria, and Only Make Believe – Ways of Playing, curated by Marina Warner at Compton Verney, UK.

Her work has been commissioned by the Science Museum, London and the Scottish National Portrait Gallery, Edinburgh, and is in a number of collections including that of the Fotomuseum Winterthur, the British Council, agnès b, the National Galleries of Scotland and Seattle's Henry Art Gallery, Washington, USA. Her work has been the subject of documentaries for BBC Two, Channel 4 and the National Galleries of Scotland.

Other commissions include Indeterminate Objects (classrooms) for The Media Wall, The Photographers' Gallery, London, October 2017 - January 2018; a site-specific project "The World in London" for The Photographers' Gallery exhibited during the 2012 Summer Olympics, and The Skater  for the Ffotogallery in Wales, 2009, to celebrate 30 years of photographic commissioning.

Recent exhibitions include: "Chat Room" (2019), curated by Hining Ye for the 2021 Shangahi Photofair; newly commissioned work "Night Garden" as part of Florilegium curated by Emma Nicholson, the inaugural biennial exhibition marking the re-opening of Inverleith House at the Royal Botanic Garden Edinburgh; "On aime l’art...!!" from the Collection Lambert, in Avignon, France (2017);  "Gravitas", curated by Christiane Monarchi for Photo50 at the London Art Fair, 2017; DATA RUSH at the Old Sugar Factory in Groningen for the 22nd Noorderlicht International Photofestival; "Digital Play : Wendy McMurdo Collected Works 1995 - 2012" at Street Level Photoworks, Glasgow, as part of GENERATION - 25 Years of Contemporary Art in Scotland, a programme of exhibitions across Scotland in 2014. Her short film "Olympia" was showcased by Onedotzero as part of their Future Cities touring programme in 2011/2012. A retrospective of her photographic work was shown at the Institute of Contemporary Interdisciplinary Arts, University of Bath in 2011/2012.

She is a senior lecturer on the MA Photography programme at Falmouth University. In 2015, McMurdo was awarded a PhD degree by publication from the University of Westminster for her work exploring the impact of the computer on photography and identity formation. She is a Senior Fellow of the Higher Education Academy (SFHEA). In September 2018, McMurdo was elected to the Royal Scottish Academy (RSA) as Member (Elect).

Previous roles include: board member for Stills Gallery (2015-2020) and New Media Scotland (2011-2014); Jill Todd Photographic Award specialist advisor and judge (2011-2014); Royal Society of Edinburgh Young People’s Committee member (2010-2014), and Travelling Gallery advisory	panel member (2013-2014); external	assessor for MA Photography Review, Central Saint Martins, London (2015); Senior	Assessor/Lecturer for the Open College of the Arts, UK; External Validator (BA	Photography) University of Chester,	UK (2015); Lecturer, School	of Fine	Art, Duncan of Jordanstone College of Art & Design, University of Dundee, UK (1990-2002) and Lecturer, School of Fine Art, Edinburgh College of Art, University of Edinburgh UK (1985-1897).

Awards

 Henry Moore Fellow (1993–1995)
 Leverhulme Research Fellow (2000-2002, 2010-2012)
 Creative Scotland Awards (2002, 2014)
 Honorary Research Fellow, European Centre for Photographic Research, University of Wales (2010)
 One of the Hundred Heroines by the Royal Photographic Society (2018)
 RSA Edinburgh Printmakers Publishing Award (2020)

Publications
 Gilda Williams (Ed) (1997). Strange Days – British Contemporary Photography. Charta Press. Milan
 David Brittain (Ed) (1999). Creative Camera: Thirty Years of Writing. Manchester University Press. Manchester
 Centro de Fotografia, Universidad de Salamanca (1998, 2000). Wendy McMurdo. Ediciones Universidad de Salamanca. Spain
 Charlotte Cotton (2004). The Photograph as Contemporary Art (World of Art). Thames & Hudson. London
 David Campany (Ed) (2007). Art and Photography (Themes & Movements). Phaidon Press Ltd. London
 Daniel Rubinstein (2009). Digitally Yours; The Body in Contemporary Photography. The Issues in Contemporary Culture and Aesthetics, 2&3. pp. 181–195. . University of the Arts. London
 Ffotogallery (2009). Wendy McMurdo: The Skater. Ffotogallery. Wales.
 Sylvia Wolf (2010). The Digital Eye: Photographic Art in the Electronic Age. Prestel. New York
 Hilde Van Gelder & Helen Westgeest (2011). Photography Theory in Historical Perspective: Case Studies from Contemporary Art. Wiley-Blackwell. Chichester, UK
 David Hopkins (2021). Dark Toys: Surrealism and the Culture of Childhood. Yale University Press. UK Europe and Overseas
 Various (2021). Nachbilder. Eine Foto Text Anthologie. Herausgegeben von der Plattform Kulturpublizistik der Zurcher Hochschule der Kunste und dem Fotomuseum Winterthur Spector Books.

References

External links
 Wendy McMurdo – Official website with comprehensive listing of artworks and publications
 Photomonitor: HI-NOON - a conversation with Rut Blees Luxemburg and Sophy Rickett, Retrieved 30 December 2021
 Commission for the Media Wall: Wendy McMurdo - Indeterminate Objects (Classrooms), 19 Oct 2017 to 17 Jan 2018, The Photographers' Gallery, London, Retrieved 12 November 2019
 My best shot. Wendy McMurdo's best photograph: two bears eye up a little girl. The Guardian, August 2018, Retrieved 30 December 2021
 My best shot. The Guardian, December 2017, Retrieved 30 December 2021
 As her project Indeterminate Objects screens on The Photographers' Gallery Media Wall, TPG Digital Curator Katrina Sluis interviews the pioneering artist Wendy McMurdo about the trajectory of her work since the 1990s and how debates around photography and digital culture have shifted, The Photographers' Gallery, London, January 2018. Retrieved 30 December 2021
 The week's most beautiful, inspiring art and photography. The Telegraph, November 2017, Retrieved 27 November 2017
 Wendy McMurdo - Let’s Go to a Place, Photomonitor, 2017, Retrieved 30 December 2021
 DATA RUSH 22nd Noorderlicht International Photofestival, 2015, Retrieved 12 November 2019
 The Photography of Wendy McMurdo: Repetition, Reflection and the Real, The Scottish Society for the History of Photography, 2015, Retrieved  30 December 2021
 Generation: 25 years of contemporary art in Scotland, 2014, Retrieved 30 December 2021
 Avatar (i): Wendy McMurdo exhibition 'The Skater' at the Ffotogallery 17 Jan 2009 – 1 Mar 2009, Retrieved 30 December 2021
 Children & Computers, Wendy McMurdo, Collected Works (1995-2014); PhD by Publication thesis, University of Westminster's online research repository, 2015
 Street Level Photoworks, 2014
 Early Research Robot (i), The Travelling Gallery, 2012, Retrieved 30 December 2021
 ‘The Digital Eye’: photographic art in the electronic age, The Seattle Times, August 13 2011, Retrieved 12 November 2019
 Solo Violinist, St Mary's School of Music, Edinburgh, 1999, Retrieved 12 November 2019
 Girl with Bears, Royal Museum of Edinburgh, 1999
 superNATURAL, Stills Gallery, Edinburgh. The Guardian, June 1999, Retrieved 27 November 2017
 ESP - Contemporary Artists Investigate The Paranormal, Ikon gallery, Birmingham. The Guardian, April 1999, Retrieved 27 November 2017
 British Library Oral History Archive – Oral History of British Photography: Wendy McMurdo
 A hundred photographic heroines. British Journal of Photography, 14 December 2018, Retrieved 29 December 2018

1962 births
Living people
Scottish contemporary artists
Alumni of the Edinburgh College of Art
Alumni of Goldsmiths, University of London
British digital artists
Women digital artists
Scottish women photographers
Artists from Edinburgh
21st-century British women artists
Pratt Institute alumni
Scottish photographers
21st-century women photographers
Senior Fellows of the Higher Education Academy